Kalateh-ye Mir Ali (also Romanized as Kalāteh-ye Mīr ‘Alī) is a village in Frughan Rural District, Rud Ab District, Sabzevar County, Razavi Khorasan Province, Iran. At the 2006 census, its population was 281, in 91 families.

References 

Populated places in Sabzevar County